Kadaba is a village in Tumkur district, Karnataka, India.

Demographics
Per the 2011 Census of India, Kadaba has a total population of 3573; of whom 1759 are male and 1814 female.

References

Villages in Tumkur district